Villain is a 1971 British gangster film directed by Michael Tuchner and starring Richard Burton, Ian McShane, Nigel Davenport and Donald Sinden. It is based on James Barlow's 1968 novel The Burden of Proof. Villain was director Michael Tuchner's first feature film after directing in television.

As with other films of Villain's same era and genre (Get Carter, A Clockwork Orange and Performance, for example), some of the violence is quite graphic, especially during the heist scene, and it foreshadows several 1970s cop TV shows such as The Sweeney, Target and Special Branch.

Plot
Ruthless East End gangster Vic Dakin has plans for an ambitious raid on the wages van of a plastics factory. This is a departure from Dakin's usual modus operandi and the job is further complicated by having to work with fellow gangster Frank Fletcher's firm.

The film's intricate subplots explore Dakin's sadistic nature, his relationship with small-time associate Wolfie and his irritation at having to work with Fletcher's seemingly weak brother-in-law Ed Lowis. Other parts of the story follow Wolfie's bisexual liaisons with Venetia and Dakin, the blackmailing of MP Gerald Draycott to provide an alibi for Dakin and the dogged detectives Bob Matthews and Tom Binney pursuing Dakin.

Cast

 Richard Burton as Vic Dakin
 Ian McShane as Wolfe Lissner
 Nigel Davenport as Bob Matthews
 Donald Sinden as Gerald Draycott
 Fiona Lewis as Venetia
 T. P. McKenna as Frank Fletcher
 Joss Ackland as Edgar Lowis
 Cathleen Nesbitt as Mrs Dakin
 Colin Welland as Tom Binney
 Elizabeth Knight as Patti
 Tony Selby as Duncan
 Del Henney as Webb
 James Cossins as Brown
 John Hallam as Terry
 Anthony Sagar as Danny
 Clive Francis as Vivian
 Shirley Cain as Mrs Matthews

Production

Writing
Unusually, the film was written by Dick Clement and Ian La Frenais, two well-known British comedy writers. They worked from a treatment by American actor Al Lettieri, renowned for his tough-guy image in films such as The Godfather and The Getaway as well as for his real-life associations with the New York Gambino Family.

Clement and La Frenais based their screenplay on Burden of Proof, a novel by James Barlow that the Chicago Tribune had called a "sizzling, compelling book." Coincidentally, Barlow mentions Richard Burton in his book in a scene in which Dakin's barrister asks a female witness if she likes Burton in an effort to sow doubt in the jury's mind about her identification evidence. Though several of the main characters and important situations carry over from the novel, Clement and La Frenais altered the plot considerably.

Casting
Burton wrote in his diaries that he was approached to make the film by Elliott Kastner, who had produced Where Eagles Dare with Burton:

It is a racy sadistic London piece about cops and robbers - the kind of 'bang bang - calling all cars' stuff that I've always wanted to do and never have. It could be more than that depending on the director. I play a cockney gangland leader who is very much a mother's boy and takes her to Southend and buys her whelks etc but in the Smoke am a ruthless fiend incarnate but homosexual as well. All ripe stuff.

Burton normally earned $1,000,000 per film but agreed to make Villain for no salary in exchange for a larger percentage of the profits. "These are the times of economies for everyone making pictures," said Burton, "And actually working this way - if you can afford it and don't mind waiting for your money - is far more exciting for the actor. You feel more involved in everything rather than just like an old hired hand."

Burton also said that the producers persuaded him to take the part through "... great American conmanship. One of the producers said to me - 'I bet if I offered you the part of a cockney gangster you'd turn it down, wouldn't you?'. And of course one's immediate response is to say - don't be daft of course I wouldn't - and the next thing you know you've got a script in your hand." Burton admitted that he had always wanted to play a gangster, having long admired Edward G. Robinson, James Cagney and Humphrey Bogart: "I suppose like the fat man who would have loved to be a ballet dancer." During filming, he said: "I usually play kings or princes or types like that ... I've never played a real villain... Interesting type. I'm not sure about this film. We'll see."

In 2013, Ian McShane said that he had mixed feelings about playing Burton's bisexual lover. "After kissing me, he's going to beat the hell out of me and it's that kind of relationship – rather hostile. It was very S&M. It wasn't shown in the film. He said to me, 'I'm very glad you're doing this film.' I said, 'So am I Richard.' He said, 'You know why, don't you?' I said, 'Why?' He said, 'You remind me of Elizabeth.' I guess that made the kissing easier."

Filming
The film was shot over ten weeks in late 1970. Exteriors were shot on location in areas of London (such as the Winstanley and York Road Estates), Brighton, Bedford and Bracknell.

Box office
British exhibitors voted Burton the most popular star at the box office in 1971, although Villain was not listed among the top ten most popular films. On 30 May 1971, Burton wrote in his diary that Villain was "... a goodish film but so far isn't doing very well in the States but has not yet opened in Britain and the Commonwealth where it should do better." On 21 August 1971, he wrote that the film's director was "whassisname" and that he:

Received a cable... from [executive] Nat Cohen saying the notices for [the film]... superb and great boxoffice, and another cable said we expect a million pounds from UK alone. That means about $1/2 m for me if I remember correctly. There is no accounting for differing tastes of Yanks and English critics. Villain was received badly in the US and with rapture in the UK. I know it is cockney and therefore difficult for Yanks to follow but one would have thought the critics to be of sufficiently wide education to take it in their stride. The English critics, after all, are not embarrassed when they see a film made in Brooklynese. Anyway I am so delighted that it is doing well in UK. Otherwise I would have doubted E's and my judgement in such matters. I thought it was good and she said she knew it was good. The American reaction was therefore a surprise.

Reception
The film received generally unfavorable reviews, possibly because it was seen as a veiled portrait of the Kray twins, who had been jailed for life in March 1969. It has been described as a "disappointingly histrionic London gangster movie." In 2009, Empire named Villain #2 in a poll of the "20 Greatest Gangster Movies You've Never Seen* (*Probably)."

References

Bibliography
 Burton, Richard, The Richard Burton Diaries.

External links
 
 
 Villain at BFI Screenonline
 "Villain" at cinemaretro.com
 "Villain" at Cinedelica.com
 

1971 films
1971 crime drama films
1970s heist films
1971 LGBT-related films
Bisexuality-related films
British crime drama films
British gangster films
British heist films
British LGBT-related films
Films shot at EMI-Elstree Studios
Films directed by Michael Tuchner
Films set in Brighton
Films set in London
LGBT-related drama films
EMI Films films
Films with screenplays by Dick Clement
Films with screenplays by Ian La Frenais
1970s English-language films
1970s British films